The Pamantasan ng Lungsod ng Maynila (from 'University of the City of Manila', abbreviated as PLM)  is a city-government-funded local university situated inside the historic walled area of Intramuros, Manila, Philippines. It was established on June 19, 1965, and opened on July 17, 1967, to 556 scholars, all coming from the top ten percent of graduates of Manila's public high schools.

PLM is the first tertiary-level institution in the country to offer tuition-free education, the first university funded solely by a city government, and the first institution of higher learning in the country to have its official name in Filipino.

From its first enrollment record of 556 freshman scholars coming from the top ten percent of the graduating classes of Manila's twenty-nine public high schools, total semestral enrollment has grown to an average of 10,000. The college has expanded from a single college to twelve colleges, seven graduate, two professional schools, and a score of research and specialized centers, including a teaching hospital, an entrepreneurial center, and an integrated learning center for toddlers. It maintains a comprehensive distance-education and open university program for thousands of community health workers and public administrators in different regions nationwide, with affiliations and recognition from various national and international organizations and institutions.

A study using cumulative data from 1999 to 2003 showed that PLM was among the top five schools nationwide in terms of board exam passing rate, and was one of three public universities in the top ten category.

History

Geographical history
The site where the PLM campus at Intramuros is situated used to be occupied by the Colegio de Manila (also known as Colegio Seminario de San Ignacio, Colegio Máximo de San Ignacio and, later, Universidad de San Ignacio; the first royal and pontifical university in the Philippines and in Asia), which was the first school in the Philippines. (Note: This is not the PLM of today). Aside from Colegio de Manila, there were other structures that were built on the site, such as Iglesia Santa Ana, the first stone church in the Philippines. Upon expulsion of the Jesuits from the Spanish Philippines, the buildings were transformed into military headquarters called Cuartel del Rey (also known as Cuartel de España), the same place where José Rizal was placed on trial for sedition here on December 26, 1896.

During the American occupation, the buildings and the whole premises served as military headquarters for the 31st Infantry of the United States Army until 1941.  Its Quonset Gym held one of the first games played  by member-schools of the NCAA. In World War II, General Douglas MacArthur held command post here, but the entire area was later destroyed by the ongoing military conflict.

In the early 1960s, the site was rehabilitated by the city government and a building was constructed at General Luna Street to house the students of Manila High School. However, on April 24, 1965, President Diosdado Macapagal issued Proclamation 392-A, giving to the proposed city university the three-hectare lot being occupied by Manila High School. On February 26, 1967, the new complex along Victoria Street was inaugurated, and the students of Manila High School were transferred there. On July 17, 1967, the first batch of PLM scholars began their studies.

Establishment
PLM was conceived during the administration of Mayor Arsenio H. Lacson, when he approved Ordinance No. 4202 on January 13, 1960, which appropriated PhP one million for the construction of the university. After Lacson died of a heart attack he was succeeded by Vice Mayor Antonio de Jesus Villegas, who continued with his plan.

On February 13, 1963, Villegas issued Executive Order No. 7 s-1963, creating a Planning and Working Committee, chaired by Dr. Benito F. Reyes, to draw up a plan to establish a city university.

Due to an impasse impending the legislature action of the city council to formally create the university, Villegas interceded for the help of then-Congressman Justo Albert of the fourth congressional district of the City of Manila to sponsor a bill in the Congress seeking to create the university which was passed by the House of Representative in 1964 as House Bill No. 8349. The Senate version of the bill was spearheaded by senators Gil Puyat and Camilo Osías,  which was passed by the Philippine Senate in 1965. The consolidation of the two bills was tackled during the Fourth Session of the Fifth Congress, which began and was held in Manila on January 25, 1965. The consolidated bill was thereafter passed by the joint Congress and was signed by Senate President Ferdinand E. Marcos and House Speaker Cornelio T. Villareal with Regino S. Eustaquio, Secretary of the Senate, and Inocencio B. Pareja, Secretary of the House of Representatives.

On June 19, 1965, the final bill, An Act Authorizing the City of Manila to Establish and Operate the University of the City of Manila and for Other Purposes, was signed into law by President Diosdado P. Macapagal, in a ceremony in Malacañang Palace. The event was witnessed by Villegas, Congressman Ramon Mitra, Jr., de Leon, and its main sponsor in the House of Representatives, Congressman Justo Albert. The law was captioned as Republic Act No. 4196,  which now serves as the university charter.

The Board of Regents, which is the governing body of the university, was formally organized in the same year as Villegas appointed the member thereof. The university regents were sworn into office during the historic day of January 9, 1967, and they conducted an election of officers on February 23, 1967. The members of the first Board of Regents were Atty. Carlos Moran Sison, chairman, Dr. Benito F. Reyes, vice chairman, Emilio Abello, Roman F. Lorenzo, Jose S. Roldan, and Primo L. Tongko, members; Fructuoso R. Yanson served as an ex-officio member and Jose F. Sugay as its secretary. Reyes was chosen as the PLM's first president.

In 1967, PLM started with a college in associate in arts and, about a year later, a graduate institute for teachers and an institute for extramural studies were formed. Reyes aggressively expanded the PLM's curriculum to include professional studies in arts and sciences, engineering, architecture, nursing, criminology, and government.

Institution

Academics and administration

As a chartered and autonomous university, PLM is governed by a Board of Regents and administered by a president. The Board of Regents, the highest decision-making body of PLM, has the authority to grant diplomas, certificates and titles to students who have completed their academic programs and validate graduation of students. The six-member Board is composed of the president of the PLM, a representative of the PLM faculty, a distinguished alumnus, a respected educator, one other respected professional, and the superintendent of the Division of City Schools-Manila. Each member serves a six-year tenure of office. The president oversees the implementation of the university policies.

Immediately under the president are the offices of four vice presidents — executive vice president, vice president for Academic Affairs, vice president for Administration, and vice president for Finance and Planning.

The university is organized into 12 undergraduate colleges, two professional schools, seven graduate schools, and an open university and distance learning program, which are all supervised by the executive vice president. These academic units collectively provide 53 single-degree undergraduate and 49 masters, doctoral, and graduate diploma programs.

The Arts and Sciences degree programs at the undergraduate level are conferred through the College of Accountancy & Economics, the College of Architecture & Urban Planning, the College of Engineering & Technology, the College of Human Development, the College of Liberal Arts, the College of Management & Entrepreneurship, the College of Mass Communication, the College of Nursing, the College of Physical Education, Recreation & Sports, the College of Physical Therapy, the College of Science, and the College of Tourism, Hotel & Travel Industry Management. Postgraduate studies are being administered through the open university and distance learning program, the College of Law, the College of Medicine, and the six graduate schools, including the Emeritus College, the Graduate School of Arts, Sciences & Education, the Graduate School of Health Sciences, the Graduate School of Engineering, the Graduate School of Law, the Graduate School of Management, and the President Ramon Magsaysay Graduate School of Public Governance.

PLM is the tenth largest university in Metro Manila, with a total student enrollment of 13,711 on January 20, 2006. For the undergraduate class of 2006–2007, PLM received 40,000 college applications, and accepted 3% of them. While admittance to the undergraduate colleges are exclusive for Manila residents, non-residents who have graduated either as Salutatorian or Valedictorian are entitled to take the PLM Admission Test and eventually qualify as freshmen. No specific residency requirements are imposed for the professional (law and medicine) and graduate schools. Full scholarship is entitled for Manila residents, while minimal fees are charged for non-residents. Other scholarships are available in the university, with funding coming from alumni donations, the government, and the private sector.

PLM's endowment in 2008 was valued at PhP 500 million, excluding budgetary allocation for its chief teaching hospital, the Ospital ng Maynila Medical Center, which was about PhP 250 million. The university spends about four to fives times the national average for education.

PLM uses a semester-based modular system for conducting courses, adopts features of the US credit system, and employs the General Weighted Average (GWA) system and a 1.00 to 5.00 grading scale.

Social involvement
As one of the participating schools of medicine in "Bagong Doktor para sa Bayan (New Doctor for the Nation)" of the national government, the College of Medicine requires that medical interns are stationed for months in far-flung barangays for experience and to apply community dynamics, family medicine theories, and appropriate technologies with the people of the community.

Students in the College of Nursing serve in 44 city-run health centers as part of their community health nursing internship. Senior students live with people in the rural areas for eight weeks and implement several socio-civic and health projects. Although not required to do so, they are encouraged to render service to the country before going abroad.

Physical therapy students in their last year in college are required to apply their learning in various settings, including rehabilitation centers in marginalized communities. As for the faculty members and students of the College of Human Development, they visit communities in Manila and assist in conducting activities such as teaching preschoolers in the city's barangay day care centers and tutoring out-of-school children through its alliance with the Educational Research and Development Assistance (ERDA) Foundation, which is the oldest non-government institution in the country that discourages impoverished children from dropping out of school. Similar activities are undertaken by the colleges that take on different approaches as in holding outreach programs in their field work, off-campus activities and on-the-job training.

In 2009, PLM launched the Alternative Learning Program (ALP), which aims to provide a practical alternative to formal instruction, using both non-formal and informal sources of knowledge and skills.

The PLM communities have also joined the Caritas Manila through Intramuros Consortium Outreach and Environment Committee (ICOEC) in its dental and medical missions in various communities. In 1993, together with Tugon-RESCUE, the university's Community University Extension Services (CUES) continued with its outreach programs for the slum communities of Tondo. Since 1999 PLM, in cooperation with the Shalom Club of the Philippines-Manila Chapter and the Rotary Club of the Philippines, has been actively donating blood for the patients of the Ospital ng Maynila Medical Center, Ospital ng Tondo and Dr. Jose R. Reyes Memorial Medical Center. Similar blood donation campaigns were conducted by other organizations within PLM such as the "Patak-patak na Pagmamahal" by the PLM Samaritans, "Blood Rush" by the Brotherhood of Medical Scholars and the "Operation Lifeline" by the PLM ROTC Unit. In July 2010, Center for Community Extension Services (CUES) launched "Dugong Alay, Dugtong Buhay", a university-wide voluntary blood donation program that has unified and streamlined the various blood donationg undertakings previously rendered by different groups and organizations inside the campus.

Research and development
PLM conducts studies and research projects that aim to aid in policy-making and in the production of prototypes that can be useful to both the university and the industry through the Intramuros Consortium and its own research division. PLM is one of the four academic institutions chosen as members of the Metropolitan Manila Industry and Energy Research and Development Consortium (MMIERDC) of the Department of Science and Technology. It is a member institution of the CHED Zonal Research Program for the National Capital Region.

Reputation

Rankings
There are no set methods for ranking institutions in the Philippines. Aside from comparisons in terms of accreditation, autonomy, and centers of excellence awarded by the Commission on Higher Education (CHED), there are attempts to rank schools based on performance in board exams conducted by the Professional Regulation Commission (PRC). The PRC and CHED sometimes publish reports on these results.

Based on the study using cumulative data from 1994 to 1998, the PLM emerged sixth. For the ten-year period 1992–2001, PLM placed ninth. In the study covering 1999 to 2003, the PLM placed fifth, making it one of the two public universities in the top five list.

No follow-up rankings had been made . However, CHED executive director Julito Vitriol said in 2009 that they were in the process of establishing appropriate guidelines to rank universities and colleges for each specific academic program or discipline.

21st century

Growth and expansion

At the turn of the 21st century PLM admitted students from outside of Manila on paying schemes for the first time. Many changes were made, and the university continued with its affiliations and consortium agreements with various educational institutions in the world.

Additional funds were made available for the university's physical development; many new facilities were built at the main campus,  and the different departments, colleges and schools were restructured. The university established a number of research units, and made research consortium agreements with other institutions.

In 2000, Pamantasang Limbagan ng Maynila (PLM University Press) was launched, the Development Center for Women Studies and Services was inaugurated, and the Manila Studies program was reviced under the new Sentro ng Araling Manileno.

From 2001 to 2003, the PLM Board of Regents expanded the PLM curriculum to include professional studies in tourism, hotel and travel industry management, and physical education and recreational sports; supported the separation of the Department of Architecture from the College of Engineering & Technology;  separated the Colleges of Arts and Sciences, and the College of Public and Business Administration into new colleges: College of Mass Communication, College of Science, College of Liberal Arts, College of Accountancy & Economics, and College of Management & Entrepreneurship; and merged the departments of social work, education and psychology into the College of Human Development.

In 2001, Mayor Lito Atienza authorized the opening of three district colleges under the city government's university system. At about the same time, the integrated learning center for toddlers commenced through the initiative of the Center for University Extension Services (CUES). as well as a winner of journalism award, Jason Gutierrez (Asia Human Rights Press Awards by the Amnesty International). Other authors and media personalities include award-winning screenwriters and directors like Adolfo Alix, Jr., Roy Iglesias, Florida M. Bautista, Real Florido, and StarStruck creator Rommel Gacho; novelist Emeniano Acain Somoza, Jr.; health communications specialist Dr. Fernado B. Perfas; journalists and columnists Atty. Berteni Causing, Willie Jose, June Nardo and Giovanni Paolo Yazon, multi-awarded radio announcer Chris Capulso, Former GMA Reporter and now Flying V Communications Head Julius Segovia, and TV host Mon Isberto.

In entertainment and television, PLM is represented by multi-awarded comedian Michael V., pop singer Aicelle Santos, theater actor Cezarah Campos, praise music artist Anthony Cailao, action star Rey Malonzo, comedian and theater actor Jerald Napoles, and drama actors Isko Moreno and Robert Ortega. In the world of beauty pageant and modelling, PLM has April Tanhueco, April Love Jordan, and Maria Sovietskaya Bacud. Mary Anne Dominique Cabrera, Little Miss Philippines 1996 3rd runner up.

PLM alumni serving as CEO or holding key positions in companies include Wilma Galvante (Senior Vice-President for Entertainment at GMA-7), Jerry Isla (Chairman and Senior Partner, Isla Lipana & Co.), Fe Tibayan-Palileo (Commissioner, Social Security System; Governor and Treasurer, Employers Confederation of the Philippines), Alvin M. Pinpin (Partner, Sycip, Gorres, Velayo & Co.), Rolando G. Peña (President and CEO of Smart Broadband; Head of Network Services Division, Smart Communications), Edith A. del Rosario (Assistant General Manager for Operations, RPN-9), Roberto del Rosario, (Vice President for Operations, IBC-13), Roberto Juanchito T. Dispo (Senior Vice President of First Metro Investment Corporation, a wholly owned Investment Bank subsidiary of Metrobank), Dr. Ricardo F. de Leon, Executive Vice President of Centro Escolar University and former President of the Mindanao State University, Director Nicanor A. Bartolome, Deputy Director-General of the Philippine National Police,  Dr. Eduardo Cabantog M.D. President, Chief Executive Officer, and Director Alliance In Motion Global, Inc. and others.

PLMayers in academia and research include business management guru Dr. Conrado E. Iñigo, Jr., nurse-educator and author Dr. Carlito Balita, Division of City Schools-Manila Superintendent Dr. María Luisa Quiñones, immunology expert and first Filipino cosmonaut–doctor Dr. Senen A. Reyes, and others.

In popular culture
The PLM has served as the alma mater for a number of fictional characters of internationally acclaimed films, including Alessandra de Rossi's fictional persona in Mga Munting Tinig, and Nora Aunor's role as Claudia in Care Home: The Movie. In 2007, the now-defunct teen-oriented show Click put on a reality show dubbed as CLICK Barkada Hunt, which involved the different love teams who had to undergo various challenges. In one of the challenges, they posed as professors of the PLM. In the 2022 GMA television series Maria Clara at Ibarra, Barbie Forteza plays the role of Maria Clara "Klay" Infantes, a nursing student from PLM who later finds herself transported into the world of Noli Me Tángere and El filibusterismo.

Gallery

See also
 List of the University of the City of Manila faculty
Universidad de Manila, the other city university of Manila
 University of the Philippines Manila, component university of the University of the Philippines system in Manila
University of Manila, private university in Manila

References

External links

 Revised PLM University Code

 
Educational institutions established in 1965
Local colleges and universities in Manila
Education in Intramuros
Universities and colleges in Manila
1965 establishments in the Philippines